Radomir Novaković (born 24 January 2000) is a German–Serbian football footballer who plays as a goalkeeper for German club Schalke 04 II.

Club career

OFK Kikinda
Novaković was born in Germany. After his second birthday, he moved with his family to Kikinda where he played for OFK Kikinda in the youth school.

Borussia Monchengladbach
Novakovic returned to Germany at the age of 12, and continued his football career in Mönchengladbach, from where he
later moved to Borussia Mönchengladbach. He first played for Borussia Monchengladbach U15, then for Borussia
Monchengladbach U16 and Borussia Monchengladbach U17.

Roda JC Kerkrade
At the age of 17, Novaković decided to leave Monchengladbach and go to the Roda JC Kerkrade in order to tried in professional football as well. At first, he was the starting goalkeeper of the youth team, but when he didn't concede a goal for 200 consecutive minutes, after 20 matches he was transferred from Roda U23 to the senior team. 
He made his Eerste Divisie debut for Roda JC Kerkrade on 7 December 2018 in a game against FC Dordrecht. He had a lot of great games, against AFC Ajax, a team that was a quarterfinalist of the UEFA Champions League at that time, FC Twente, Sparta Rotterdam, SC Heerenveen. He played 25 games and spent 2,100 minutes on the pitch in the Eredivisie, he did not concede a goal in four matches.

FK Inđija
After the structural changes in Roda, he wanted to change the environment and sign for the club where he will be the standard goalkeeper again. He made his debut for FK Inđija on 21 October 2020, in the Serbian Cup match against IMT.

Schalke 04 II
In January 2022, he returned to Germany, signing with Schalke 04 II.

Career statistics

Club

Honours
Borussia Monchengladbach U16
Mayor's cup

References

External links
 

Radomir Novakovic at FmDataba

2000 births
Sportspeople from Mönchengladbach
Living people
German footballers
Serbian footballers
Association football goalkeepers
Roda JC Kerkrade players
FK Inđija players
Ayia Napa FC players
FC Schalke 04 II players
Eerste Divisie players
Serbian SuperLiga players
Regionalliga players
Expatriate footballers in the Netherlands
German expatriate sportspeople in the Netherlands
Expatriate footballers in Cyprus
German expatriate sportspeople in Cyprus
Footballers from North Rhine-Westphalia